The 1989 Nottinghamshire County Council election was held on Thursday, 4 May 1989. The whole council of eighty-eight members was up for election and the result was that the Labour Party retained control of the Council, winning fifty seats. The Conservatives won thirty-four councillors and the Social and Liberal Democrats won four seats.

Minor boundary changes took place for this election, with the parish of Broadholme being transferred to Lincolnshire and the division of Newstead was enlarged by the addition of Ravenshead which had been transferred to Gedling from Newark and Sherwood in 1987.

Results by division
Each electoral division returned one county councillor. The candidate elected to the council in each electoral division is shown in the table below.

References

1989
1989 English local elections
1980s in Nottinghamshire